Bithnah is a village in Fujairah, United Arab Emirates (UAE), long occupying a strategic location in the Wadi Ham, which is the only natural link to the interior of the UAE and the Persian Gulf from the East Coast city, and Emirate of Fujairah.

Located between Fujairah City and Masafi, the village is the site of a significant stone and mudbrick fort – Bithnah Fort – and a little-known megalithic tomb that links the village to a 3,000-year-old trade route along Wadi Ham through the Hajar Mountains from the East Coast emirate of Fujairah through Masafi (itself part of Ras Al Khaimah) and Manama down to the desert town of Dhaid and then to Sharjah and the Persian Gulf. It has traditionally been inhabited by members of the Sharqiyin (Al Sharqi) tribe.

History

The Wadi Suq tomb at Bithnah was first excavated by the Swiss-Liechtenstein Foundation for Archaeological Research Abroad (SLFA) between 1987 and 1991. Presided over by Prince Hans-Adam II of Liechtenstein, and directed in the field by Pierre Corboud, the SLFA team conducted several seasons of survey in the mountainous inland area of Fujairah, including the excavations at Bithnah, where a communal Wadi Suq era grave site was uncovered as well as a number of Iron Age finds. There have also been excavations by teams from the University of Geneva and French National Research Centre.

Significant Iron Age finds have been made throughout the area, including a number of petroglyphs. Iron Age finds at Bithnah include buildings and structures that appear to have a religious function, together with finds of snake-decorated ceramics and incense burners, with columned halls and signs of a water distribution strategy tied to centralised authority. The link between snakes and water, evidence of funerary rites and snake worship, is strong.

Bithnah was the site of a significant battle in 1745, according to the historian Ibn Ruzaiq, between members of the Qawasim (Al Qasimi) and Na'im tribes and the Omani Imam and governor of Sohar, Ahmed bin Said. The battle took place when the Qawasim together with the Na’im of Buraimi attempted to fight their way through the Wadi Ham to take the east coast and its great prize, the port of Sohar. This was to mark a new era in the history of the area: the drawn-out battle between the Saidi Omanis against the Qawasim of Ras Al Khaimah and Sharjah, and other tribes of the West coast and interior.

By the turn of the 20th century, Bithnah was a village consisting of some 50 houses of Sharqiyin origin, with some 600 sheep and goats and 4,000 date palms.

Bithnah Fort

Bithnah Fort is thought to date back to the late 18th century, having been built as a result of the Wahhabi incursions of the early 1800s following the Battle of Bithnah. The fort is constructed from stone, mudbrick, and palm-wood planking.

Prior to the construction of the road to Masafi in the 1970s, traffic through to the interior from the coast passed through the bed of the wadi, overlooked by the fort which would have occupied a strategic location – in fact, Bithnah through the ages has been a strategic holding and was a key mainstay in the fortunes of the Sharqiyin through the 18th and early 19th centuries.

In 1884, Sheikh Hamad bin Abdullah Al Sharqi took Bithnah Fort, control of which was to be essential for him when, in 1901, he once again refused the suzerainty of Sharjah and used the fort at Bithnah to refuse aid to the headman of Kalba, who was related to Sheikh Saqr bin Khalid of Sharjah. Together with help from the Shihuh under Ali Bin Ibrahim and Zaid Sinan Kumazari, the Sharqiyin drove the Qawasim out of Bithnah in 1902. This event sealed the de facto independence of Fujairah which was not, however, recognised by the British until 1952.

Prior to 2009, the fort was inhabited by a local man from Bithnah, Saed Ali Saed Al Yamahi.

References

Populated places in the Emirate of Fujairah
Villages in the United Arab Emirates
1800 establishments in Asia
Infrastructure completed in 1800
Buildings and structures completed in 1800
Buildings and structures in the Emirate of Fujairah
History of the United Arab Emirates
Archaeology of the United Arab Emirates